Edward William Staebler (December 26, 1872November 10, 1946) was a Michigan politician.

Early life
Edward W. Staebler was born in Lodi Township, Michigan to parents Michael and Katherine Rosina Staebler on December 26, 1872. Staebler was of German ancestry.

Career
Staebler was involved with an early automobile dealership in the city of Ann Arbor, Michigan. Staebler served as mayor of Ann Arbor from 1926 to 1931. Staebler was a Democrat. In 1932, Staebler ran unsuccessfully for the Michigan State House of Representatives representing Washtenaw County.

Personal life
Staebler married Magdalena Dold in 1895. Together, they had at least two children including U.S. Representative Neil Staebler.

Death
Staebler died on November 10, 1946. Staebler was interred at Forest Hill Cemetery in Ann Arbor.

References

1872 births
1946 deaths
Burials in Michigan
Michigan Democrats
American people of German descent
Mayors of Ann Arbor, Michigan
20th-century American politicians